HMAS Gull (M 1185) (formerly HMS Swanston) was a  that served in the Royal Navy (RN) and Royal Australian Navy (RAN).

Construction
The ship was built by J. S. Doig Limited at Grimsby, England for the RN. The ship was commissioned as HMS Swanston.

Operational history

Australia
The minesweeper was sold to the RAN in 1961, and was recommissioned as HMAS Gull on 19 July 1962.

During the mid-1960s, Gull was one of several ships operating in support of the Malaysian government during the Indonesia-Malaysia Confrontation. This service was later recognised with the battle honour "Malaysia 1964–66".

Decommissioning and fate
HMAS Gull paid off on 7 November 1969.

References

Ton-class minesweepers of the Royal Navy
Ships built on the Humber
1954 ships
Cold War minesweepers of the United Kingdom
Ton-class minesweepers of the Royal Australian Navy
Cold War minesweepers of Australia